Lost LA is a public television historical documentary series that explores Southern California's hidden past through documents, photos, and other rare artifacts from the region's libraries and archives.

Hosted by writer and historian Nathan Masters, each episode of Lost LA brings the primary sources of Los Angeles history to the screen in surprising new ways and connects them to the Los Angeles of today. Much of the past is lost to history, but through the region's archives, we can rediscover a forgotten Los Angeles.

The half-hour series is co-produced by KCET and USC Libraries and is broadcast by KCET, PBS SoCal and other public television stations.

Development
The show began as a series of online articles that featured historical materials from the L.A. as Subject research alliance. When the online series became successful, it was spun off into its own TV series.

Funders 
Lost LA is made possible by Anne Ray Foundation, a Margaret A. Cargill Philanthropy; The Ralph M. Parsons Foundation; and the California State Library.

 Plot 
Los Angeles is often thought of as a city without a history, an instant metropolis defined by the glitz and glamour of the entertainment industry. Lost LA challenges these stereotypes, offering a history of Southern California not found in other media. Unlike other history shows which only look backward at antiquarian arcana, Lost LA'' explains the Southern California of today and how we got here.

Episodes

Season 1 (Premiered January 27, 2016)

Special Summer Episode (2017)

Season 2 (Premiered October 10, 2017)

Season 3 (Premiered October 9, 2018)

Season 4 (Premiered October 15, 2019)

Season 5 (Premiered March 19, 2022)

Cast and characters 
Historian Nathan Masters has hosted the series since its inception. Los Angeles City Archivist Michael Holland has also appeared in several episodes.

Production 
New episodes are produced every year, typically premiering in the Fall.

Awards 
The series has been honored with numerous awards, including four Los Angeles Area Emmy Awards; the Los Angeles Press Club's SoCal Journalism Award; the Los Angeles Press Club's National Arts & Entertainment Journalism Award; and the Radio and Television News Association (RTNA) of Southern California's Golden Mike Award.

References

External links 
 
 

2016 American television series debuts
2010s American documentary television series
History of Los Angeles
Television series about the history of the United States
University of Southern California
Works about cities in the United States